Izumiya (泉谷) is a Japanese surname. It may refer to:

Naoki Izumiya (born 1948), Japanese businessman
Seizo Izumiya (born 1961), Japanese martial artist, karate master, and coach
Shigeru Izumiya (born 1948), Japanese poet, folk singer, actor, and tarento
Shunsuke Izumiya (born 2000), Japanese hurdler

See also
Izumiya, a Japanese supermarket chain

Japanese-language surnames